The fourth season of the police procedural drama NCIS was originally broadcast between September 19, 2006, and May 22, 2007. Special Agent Leroy Jethro Gibbs left NCIS at the end of season three after a terrorist attack had been successful because his superiors did not heed his warnings in time. The team is now led by Anthony DiNozzo for a short time until Gibbs' eventual return. New characters introduced in this season are Michelle Lee, who was briefly on DiNozzo's team and was transferred to the legal department upon Gibbs' return, and (already in the final episodes of season 3) Gibbs' former boss and mentor Mike Franks, both as recurring characters. Also, albeit later in the season, Army CID Lieutenant Colonel Hollis Mann is introduced as another love interest for Gibbs.

In December 2006, Bill Keveney from USA Today announced that the "CBS investigative drama NCIS topped the Nielsen viewership list for the first time with 17.4 million. CBS was the No. 1 network in viewers and young adults (ages 18 to 49) for the week of Dec. 11–17."

TV Guide reported on May 5, 2007, that creator and showrunner Donald Bellisario would step down and leave the series due to a disagreement with series star Mark Harmon. Because of Bellisario's "chaotic management style", Harmon threatened to leave NCIS. Co-executive producer Chas. Floyd Johnson and head writer Shane Brennan replaced Bellisario as showrunner.

Cast

Main 
 Mark Harmon as Leroy Jethro Gibbs, NCIS Supervisory Special Agent (SSA) of the Major Case Response Team (MCRT) assigned to Washington's Navy Yard 
 Michael Weatherly as Anthony DiNozzo, NCIS Senior Special Agent, second in command of MCRT
 Cote de Pablo as Ziva David, Mossad Liaison Officer to  NCIS
 Pauley Perrette as Abby Sciuto, Forensic Specialist for NCIS
 Sean Murray as Timothy McGee, NCIS Junior Special Agent
 Lauren Holly as Jenny Shepard, NCIS Director
 David McCallum as Dr. Donald "Ducky" Mallard, Chief Medical Examiner for NCIS

Recurring 
 Joe Spano as Tobias Fornell, FBI Senior Special Agent
 Jessica Steen as Paula Cassidy, NCIS Senior Special Agent
 Brian Dietzen as Jimmy Palmer, Assistant Medical Examiner for NCIS
 Troian Bellisario as Sarah McGee, Tim McGee's sister
 Mary Mouser as Kelly Gibbs, Gibbs' deceased daughter 
 Stephanie Mello as Cynthia Summer, NCIS Secretary to Director Shepard
 Muse Watson as Mike Franks, retired Senior Special Agent for NCIS and Gibbs' former boss
 Don Franklin as Ron Sacks, FBI Special Agent
 Scottie Thompson as Jeanne Benoit, Tony's girlfriend while undercover
 Armand Assante as René Benoit, NCIS target
 Susanna Thompson as Hollis Mann, Gibbs' girlfriend and Army CID Agent
 Liza Lapira as Michelle Lee, NCIS Special Agent
 David Dayan Fisher as Trent Kort, CIA Agent
 Sandra Hess as Regine Smidt, associate of René Benoit
 Corey Stoll as Martin Quinn, associate of René Benoit
 Enzo Cilenti as Mamoun Sharif, NCIS target
 Payton Spencer as Emily Fornell, Tobias Fornell's daughter

Episodes

DVD special features
Cast and Crew Commentaries on Select Episodes
Cast Roundtable (Parts 1 & 2)
Ducky's World
Behind the Set:  The Production Design of N.C.I.S.
Dressed to Kill: Dressing the Sets of N.C.I.S.
Prop Master
Picture Perfect: The Looks of N.C.I.S.
Season of Secrets

References

 General references 
 
 
 

2006 American television seasons
2007 American television seasons
NCIS 04